Lycée Robert Schuman may refer to:

France 
Lycée Robert Schuman (Charenton-le-Pont), Charenton-le-Pont, Val-de-Marne (Paris metropolitan area)
Lycée Robert Schuman (Dugny), a private school in Dugny, Seine-Saint-Denis (Paris metropolitan area)
Lycée Robert Schuman (Haugenau), Hagenau
 - Metz, Moselle

Luxembourg 
Lycée Robert Schuman (Luxembourg) in Luxembourg City